The Society of the Sacred Mission (SSM), with the associated Company of the Sacred Mission, is an Anglican religious order founded in 1893 by Father Herbert Kelly, envisaged such that "members of the Society share a common life of prayer and fellowship in a variety of educational, pastoral and community activities". Its motto is Ad gloriam Dei in eius voluntate ("To the glory of God in his will").

Owing to the long association with Kelham, and the theological college there, the Society is often known colloquially as the "Kelham Fathers", although it has now become a mixed community for both men and women. There are three types of membership in the society:
professed members, who remain celibate and live in community, taking vows of poverty, chastity, and obedience (the Evangelical Counsels);
associate members, who also live or work in community, but do not take vows, and may be married;
companions, who do not normally live in community, and who take a single vow to "endeavour to live [their] whole life to the glory of God", form the Company of the Sacred Mission.

Professed members have included Gabriel Hebert and George Every.

Although it has been involved in many other ventures, the major work of the Society has been the theological training of candidates for ordination in the Anglican Communion, carried out at two major theological seminaries: Kelham College in England, and St Michael's House in Australia.

Foundation
SSM was inaugurated on 9 May 1893  in Kennington, with Kelly, Badcock, and Chilvers as its three initial novices. The original purpose was "to train people for missionary service in Korea. Somehow we got side-tracked into training clergy for the Church in England - but that stopped in the 1970s." 

Central to its ethos, at its foundation and since then, has been the inclusion of ordinary men. Kelly was clear from the outset that this was not a way of life for religious virtuosos. In 1898 he wrote, "No system can be sound which depends for success upon rare and special gifts, rather than upon the steady use of those more limited and commonplace powers which God ordinarily wills to bestow."

Kelham Hall

Kelly's missionary work began in 1902 in South Africa (Modderpoort was taken over, in 1902, by the Society of the Sacred Mission), and the next year Kelham Hall was purchased to become the mother house of the Society, and the site of the theological college which the Society had established in 1894. The college's academic hoods were "black, the cowl faced 3 inches and bound 1 inch (with) Sarum red."

Kelham Hall had been built between 1859 and 1862 by Sir George Gilbert Scott, the architect of St Pancras Station, with which it shares the same Gothic style. From 1903 it served as the theological college, and the Society of the Sacred Mission added a great domed chapel, completed and dedicated in 1928. The chapel is almost square in shape, dominated architecturally by the great central dome (62 feet across and 68 feet high), which is the second largest concrete dome in England. Kelham parish church is located immediately adjacent to the hall.

The lifestyle, for both monks and students, was simple. The Hall had no lighting except oil lamps, no heating except open fires, and no water supply above the ground floor. However, it boasted ample space, with accommodation for up to 100 students, and extensive gardens and playing fields. Kelham remained the mother house of the Society for seventy years.

Kelham was occupied by military personnel during both world wars. The Hall "was sold to the society of the Sacred Mission in 1903 and housed the Monastic order for the next 70 years...the main accommodation building at the front of the Hall was completed in 1939 to house the Monks and the theological students but its first occupants were a garrison of the ‘Blues’ cavalry and also Texas and Oklahoma oil men who were involved in drilling for oil at the nearby Eakring oilfield. After the war, the SSM Order returned to the site and, until their organisation was re-structured in 1972, continued to live there adding a certain charm and interest to the village."At its peak operation in the 1950s and early 1960s, the SSM had more than 80 professed brothers in membership, as well as a large novitiate, but numbers decreased through the latter part of the decade and by 1972 the college reported a number of student applications that made its viability questionable. Total applications to the college "dropped from 400 a year before the war to less than 40 students in 1971 and the college closed in 1973."

Kelham Hall is a grade I listed building, and the associated monastic buildings of 1927-1929, including the chapel, are grade II listed.

College life
A view of life at Kelham Hall can be seen from the memories of its former student. The Rev'd Vincent Strudwick studied at the college in the 1950s. The Rev'd John Mullineaux "attended Queen Elizabeth's Grammar School, Blackburn, and Manchester University where he obtained a Bachelor of Arts degree (Honours English Language & Literature). He trained for the priesthood at Kelham Theological College, a monastic institution near Newark, Nottinghamshire where he served five years as a Novice. Amongst his duties were the regular feeding of the pigs, being in charge of the kitchen garden, stoker of the coke boiler and electrician - learning house re-wiring."

The Rev'd Eric Mercer was a student at a "Theological College in Nottinghamshire, then the mother house of the Society of the Sacred Mission which for several generations had broken new ground in opening its doors to non-graduates, boys and men from all backgrounds. The spartan tradition at Kelham in those days owed as much to First World War economies as it did to monastic 
asceticism."

Chad Payne was a professed member of the society from 1971-1980, having formerly been a student at its theological college from 1966. He was the last person to make his profession in the great Chapel. He recalls the authoritarian nature of the Society in those days, an authoritarianism that was to last well into the early years at Willen, and the inability of those in charge to relate in any meaningful way with its members. Childish petulance was the response to any questioning of local leadership . Many left the Society with their vocations crushed rather than supported, but went on to considerable achievements elsewhere. The Society may have been highly principled but lacked humanity and the ability to come to terms with the changing needs of its brothers, preferring to bury its head in pseudo intellectualism. Both at Kelham and Willen, SSM had a Christian shell but little in the way of Christian substance. Chad recalls advice given to him by Brother Patrick shortly before he died ' leave while you can, lest you become a child like the rest of us and unable to leave '

The Rev'd Clement Mullenger describes the Kelham Theological College as "a very rigid and compartmentalised hierarchy...Kelham in its heyday of the late 1930s had certain built-in authoritarian terrors comprising histrionic monologues, directives on notice boards, and a general atmosphere under one roof and round one holy table of a great gulf fixed between them and us...the Society was too concerned with its own satisfactoriness and permanence to think that communication with people not actually enclosed behind its hedges needed much attention. Nor was there any awareness that (apart from subscriptions) we needed anything of love, sympathy or care from them...(there was) a militaristic atmosphere said to derive from Kelly's time at Sandhurst."

Willen Priory
In 1973 the Society established St Michael's Priory at Willen, which became the chief operation of SSM following the closure of Kelham. In 1997 a new ecumenical lay community called "The Well" was established in the priory, and the SSM brothers moved out to a smaller house nearby. The name referenced the story of Christ and the woman of Samaria in St John's Gospel. The Well ran a conference and retreat centre, and worked with the homeless and distressed. In 2007 the SSM priory and The Well merged, and in 2016 the combined operation reverted to its original name as St Michael's Priory. It closed in 2019, and the remaining members relocated to St Antony's Priory in Durham.

St Michael's House, Crafers

St Michael's House at Crafers, South Australia was bequeathed to the Anglican Diocese of Adelaide in 1943 by Mrs Audine O'Leary. The Bishop, Bryan Robin, who had briefly been a member of a religious community, immediately invited SSM to take over the extensive property, and establish both a monastic priory and a theological college, on the same model as Kelham.

The Society arrived in 1947, with Fr Basil Oddie as the first Prior of St Michael's, Warden of the theological college, and superior of the province. Both priory and college grew rapidly, with extensive construction of additional buildings, including a large chapel and a large refectory.

The theological college and the priory were totally destroyed, along with thousands of other homes and buildings, in the devastating Ash Wednesday bushfires of 1983.

Current provinces and priories
The Society is organised into three provinces, and members within each province live in local priories.

European province
Following the closure of St Michael's Priory (Willen) in 2019, the main house of the province is St Antony's Priory in Durham, which opened in 1985, with a new chapel constructed in 1989.

The provincial superior of the European province is Fr Jonathan Ewer. The visitor is John Pritchard, former Bishop of Oxford.

Southern African province
In 2008 the society completed a new purpose-built priory in Maseru, Lesotho, which is the current mother house of the province.

The provincial superior of the Southern African Province is Tanki Job Mofana. The visitor is Thabo Makgoba, Archbishop of Cape Town.

Australian province
The province was once very large, and undertook theological education and training of priests. The original mother house of the province, from 1947, was St Michael's Priory in Crafers. The role was taken over by the Priory at Diggers Rest, Victoria following the complete destruction of St Michael's Priory by fire, with a subsidiary priory in Adelaide. The province has since contracted in size, and now operates only St John's Priory at Adelaide. 

The provincial superior of the Australian Province is Fr David McDougall. The visitor is John Stead, Bishop of Willochra.

In literature
Robertson Davies depicted the society by name in his novel The Rebel Angels.

Richard Holloway describes his life as a schoolboy with the Society of the Sacred Mission at Kelham Hall in his autobiography Leaving Alexandria: A Memoir of Faith and Doubt'' (2014).

See also
Theologisk Oratorium

References

External links
 SSM European Province website
 St Antony's Priory (Durham) website
 SSM Records at the Historical Manuscripts Commission
 Current Kelham Hall web site
 Kelham, by Manfred Knodt. Article in Quatember 1962 (p. 77-80)

Anglican orders and communities
Religious organizations established in 1893
Anglican organizations established in the 19th century
Religious orders